Thomas William Loten (born 8 January 1999) is an English cricketer. He made his List A debut on 6 May 2019, for Yorkshire in the 2019 Royal London One-Day Cup. He made his first-class debut on 23 September 2019, for Yorkshire in the 2019 County Championship.

References

External links
 

1999 births
Living people
English cricketers
Yorkshire cricketers
Cricketers from York